José Maria Hernández González (January 17, 1927 – January 19, 2015) was a Catholic bishop.

Ordained to the priesthood in 1950, Hernández González was named bishop of the Diocese of Chilapa, Mexico in 1983 and then in 1989 was named bishop of Netzahaulcóyotl. He retired in 2003.

Notes

1927 births
2015 deaths
21st-century Roman Catholic bishops in Mexico
20th-century Roman Catholic bishops in Mexico